Ch'unch'uni (Aymara ch'unch'u head, -ni a suffix to indicate ownership, "the one with a head", ch'unch'uni murderer; full, Hispanicized spelling Chunchune) is a mountain in the Andes of southern Peru, about  high. It is situated in the Moquegua Region, General Sánchez Cerro Province, Ichuña District, northeast of Jukumarini Lake. Jaqhi Jaqhini lies west of the mountain Wallqani and north of Jaqhi Jaqhini.

References

Mountains of Moquegua Region
Mountains of Peru